The 1985-86 FIBA Women's European Champions Cup was the 28th edition of FIBA Europe's competition for national champions women's basketball clubs, running from 3 October 1985 to 20 March 1986. Defending champion Primigi Vicenza defeated Agon Düsseldorf in a rematch of the 1983 edition's final to win its third title.

Qualifying round

First round

Group stage

Group A

Group B

Semifinals

Final

References

Champions Cup
EuroLeague Women seasons